The 1973–74 Southern Football League season was the 71st in the history of the league, an English football competition.

Dartford won the championship, winning their third Southern League title, whilst Burton Albion, Stourbridge, Bath City and Wealdstone were all promoted to the Premier Division. Six Southern League clubs applied to join the Football League at the end of the season, but none were successful.

Premier Division
The Premier Division consisted of 22 clubs, including 18 clubs from the previous season and four new clubs:
Two clubs promoted from Division One North:
Atherstone Town
Grantham

Two clubs promoted from Division One South:
Maidstone United
Tonbridge

At the end of the season Guildford City, who lost its ground earlier, merged with Dorking to form a new club Guildford & Dorking United. Also, Folkestone was renamed Folkestone and Shepway.

League table

Division One North
Division One North consisted of 22 clubs, including 18 clubs from the previous season and four new clubs:
Bletchley Town, transferred from Division One South
Burton Albion, relegated from the Premier Division
Dunstable Town, transferred from Division One South
Witney Town, joined from the Hellenic Football League

Also, at the end of the previous season Lockheed Leamington was renamed AP Leamington.

At the end of the season Bletchley Town was renamed Milton Keynes City.

League table

Division One South
Division One North consisted of 20 clubs, including 17 clubs from the previous season and three new clubs, relegated from the Premier Division:
Poole Town
Ramsgate
Waterlooville

League table

Football League elections
Alongside the four League clubs facing re-election, a total of seven non-League clubs applied for election, six of which were Southern League clubs. All the League clubs were re-elected.

See also
 Southern Football League
 1973–74 Northern Premier League

References
RSSF – Southern Football League archive

Southern Football League seasons
S